America's Top Dog is a television series that premiered on A&E in January 2020. The show is hosted by actor David Koechner and sportscaster Curt Menefee, while Rachel Bonnetta serves as the sideline reporter for the show. The first season was filmed at Sable Ranch in Santa Clarita. The second and third seasons were filmed back-to-back in Simi Valley.

Format

Season 1
In the show, five dogs and their handlers—usually four police K-9 teams and one civilian team—compete in a three-phase competition. The first phase, the Canine Combine, is an obstacle course that includes the car slalom (where the dogs jump in and out of cars), the fire escape (where the dogs pull down the doors to get to the next level), the high jump (where the dogs jump over walls, or in some cases, crawl under them), the rope bridge (where the dogs run across an unstable rope bridge), and the splashdown (where the dogs swim across a small pool to the finish). The fastest four dogs through the Combine advance to the next phase. The next phase is the Boneyard, a scent detection test, where the dogs try to find as many scented objects as possible (out of five), and alert their handlers to the find, in a maze of rooms in five minutes or less. For each dog's run, the scent used is whatever the dog is most familiar with. The two dogs that find the most objects (or that find them the fastest, in case of a tie) advance to the final phase. In the last phase, the Doghouse, the dogs and handlers make their way through a "house," including knocking down the door, climbing through the window into a spider-web of bungees, low-crawling, climbing boxes, running through a duct-work tunnel, breaching two doors (with the dog pulling the door open), and finally apprehending a "suspect," including taking him down and then releasing on command and returning to the handler. The dog that completes the phase the fastest wins the title of "America's Top Dog," $10,000, an additional $5,000 donated to the animal charity of their choice, and the opportunity to compete in the grand finale, which has a $25,000 prize.

Season 2

Season Two features a new format, with dogs facing against each other in head-to-head matches across classes of working dogs, police K-9 dogs and "underdogs". The winners of the three classes then face off against each other, with the final winner receiving a $10,000 cash prize and a choice to donate $5,000 to an animal charity of their choice. The final contest features winners of the previous weeks going head-to-head for a cash prize of $25,000.

Contestants and winners by episode

Season 1

Season 2

Ratings

Season 1 (2020)

Season 2 (2021)

Season 3 (2021)

Remake

The German TV channel RTL acquired rights from A&E for remaking the show into a six-episode series titled Top Dog Germany (German: Der Beste Hund Deutschlands). It premiered on July 23, 2021.

See also

 2020 in American television

References

External links
 Website
 Big Fish Entertainment  America' Top Dog

2020 American television series debuts
A&E (TV network) original programming
Television shows about dogs
Television shows filmed in California